Vir Bahadur Singh Planetarium (also spelled 'Veer' or 'Bir') is a tourist attraction in Gorakhpur, Uttar Pradesh, India. It has been run by the Council of Science & Technology, Uttar Pradesh since 21 December 2009.

This planetarium runs three daily, 45-minute shows at 1pm, 3pm and 5pm. It has a dome size of 18m and a seating capacity of 395. It is based on digital technology, and six equipments of CRT, Evans and Sutherland are installed here.

References

See also
 List of planetariums

Planetaria in India
Tourist attractions in Gorakhpur
Buildings and structures in Gorakhpur